Andre Levett Robertson (born October 2, 1957) is an American retired baseball second baseman and shortstop. He played five seasons for the New York Yankees of Major League Baseball (MLB). He was signed by the Toronto Blue Jays in the 4th round of the  June Amateur Draft. He was once a highly touted prospect in the Yankees' organization, but a 1983 car accident left him with a broken neck and other injuries, and he never regained his skills.

References

External links

1957 births
Living people
New York Yankees players
African-American baseball players
Dunedin Blue Jays players
Syracuse Chiefs players
Fort Lauderdale Yankees players
Nashville Sounds players
Columbus Clippers players
Richmond Braves players
Chattanooga Lookouts players
Huntsville Stars players
Tacoma Tigers players
Oklahoma City 89ers players
Texas Longhorns baseball players
Major League Baseball second basemen
Major League Baseball shortstops
Baseball players from Texas
21st-century African-American people
20th-century African-American sportspeople